Blake Brettschneider (born April 11, 1989 in Georgia) is a retired American soccer player, who is currently an attorney.

Career

Youth
Brettschneider played soccer for the University of South Carolina. In 2010, he led the team with 7 goals and 10 assists.  While at the University of South Carolina, he also played in the USL Premier Development League for both the Atlanta Silverbacks U23's and the Atlanta Blackhawks.

Professional
Brettschneider was selected by D.C. United with the third pick in the second round of the 2011 MLS Supplemental Draft. He signed a contract with the team on March 3, 2011, and made his professional debut on April 3, 2011, in a 4-1 loss to the Colorado Rapids. Brettschneider scored his first career goal on June 11, 2011 in a 4-2 loss against San Jose Earthquakes.

Brettschnider was released by United on February 3, 2012. On March 6, 2012, he signed as a free agent with New England Revolution. He was released by New England following the 2012 season.
Brettschnider was picked up by the Rochester Rhinos of the USL Pro league.

International
In 2008 Brettschneider participated in the United States U-20 men's national soccer team player pool camp, but did not feature in any games.

Post-career 
At the end of the 2013 season, Brettschneider was released by Rochester, and subsequently retired from professional soccer. He moved back to the Atlanta metropolitan area to work in the finance industry from 2014 until 2018 for companies such as Northwestern Mutual, Sage Group, and NuVasive. In 2018, he enrolled in the University of Denver's Sturm College of Law, where he graduated in 2021.

References

External links
 

1989 births
Living people
People from Lilburn, Georgia
Sportspeople from the Atlanta metropolitan area
Soccer players from Georgia (U.S. state)
American soccer players
Association football forwards
South Carolina Gamecocks men's soccer players
Atlanta Silverbacks U23's players
Atlanta Blackhawks players
D.C. United draft picks
D.C. United players
New England Revolution players
Rochester New York FC players
USL League Two players
USL Championship players
Major League Soccer players
United States men's under-20 international soccer players
21st-century American lawyers
Sturm College of Law alumni
Lawyers from Denver
Colorado lawyers
Georgia (U.S. state) lawyers